Gennadi Alekseyevich Grishin (born 25 November 1964) is a former Russian professional footballer.

Club career
He made his professional debut in the Soviet Second League in 1982 for FC Metallurg Lipetsk.

Honours
 Soviet Top League bronze: 1988, 1991.
 Soviet Cup winner: 1986.
 Soviet Cup finalist: 1988, 1989, 1991.
 Russian Cup winner: 1993.

European club competitions
With FC Torpedo Moscow.

 UEFA Cup Winners' Cup 1986–87: 2 games.
 UEFA Cup 1988–89: 2 games.
 UEFA Cup Winners' Cup 1989–90: 4 games.
 UEFA Cup 1990–91: 7 games, 1 goal.
 UEFA Cup 1991–92: 4 games, 1 goal.
 UEFA Cup 1992–93: 4 games, 1 goal (also scored a decisive penalty kick in the shootout against Manchester United).
 UEFA Cup Winners' Cup 1993–94: 2 games.

References

1964 births
People from Lipetsk Oblast
Living people
Soviet footballers
Russian footballers
Association football midfielders
FC Metallurg Lipetsk players
FC Torpedo Moscow players
FC Torpedo-2 players
1. FC Lokomotive Leipzig players
Hapoel Haifa F.C. players
FC Shinnik Yaroslavl players
FC Tom Tomsk players
FC KAMAZ Naberezhnye Chelny players
Soviet Top League players
Russian Premier League players
Russian expatriate footballers
Expatriate footballers in Germany
Expatriate footballers in Israel
FC Iskra Smolensk players
Sportspeople from Lipetsk Oblast